The 11th Aerobic Gymnastics European Championships took place in Baku, Azerbaijan from May 24 to 26, 2019.

Medals summary

Medalists

Medal standings

References

Aerobic Gymnastics European Championships
2019 in gymnastics
International gymnastics competitions hosted by Azerbaijan
2019 in Azerbaijani sport